The Asian Games, also known as Asiad, is a continental multi-sport event held every four years among athletes from all over Asia. The Games were regulated by the Asian Games Federation (AGF) from the first Games in New Delhi, India, until the 1978 Games. Since the 1982 Games, they have been organized by the Olympic Council of Asia (OCA), after the breakup of the Asian Games Federation. The Games are recognized by the International Olympic Committee (IOC) and are described as the second largest multi-sport event after the Olympic Games.

There have been nine nations that have hosted the Asian Games. Forty-six nations have participated in the Games, including Israel, which was excluded from the Games after their last participation in 1974. The most recent games was held in Jakarta and Palembang, Indonesia from 18 August to 2 September 2018. The next games are scheduled to be held in Hangzhou, China.

Since 2010, host cities manage both the Asian Games and the Asian Para Games, the latter an event for athletes with disabilities to compete with each other. The Asian Para Games are held immediately following the Asian Games, but the exclusion of Asian Para Games from any Asian Games host city contract means that both events will run independently of each other.

History

Prior formation
The Far Eastern Championship Games existed previous to the Asian Games, the former mooted in 1912 for a location set between Japan, the Philippines, and China. The inaugural Far Eastern Games were held in Manila in 1913 with 6 participating nations. There were ten Far Eastern Games held by 1934. The second Sino-Japanese War in 1934, and Japan's insistence on including the Manchu Empire as a competitor nation in the Games, brought China to announce its withdrawal from participation. The Far Eastern Games scheduled for 1938 were cancelled. The organization was discontinued.

Formation
After World War II, several areas in Asia became sovereign states. Many of these countries sought to exhibit Asian prowess without violence. At the London 1948 Summer Olympics, a conversation started amongst China and the Philippines to restore the idea of the Far Eastern Games. Guru Dutt Sondhi, the Indian International Olympic Committee representative, believed that the restoration of the Far Eastern Games would sufficiently display the spirit of unity and level of achievement taking place in Asian sports. He proposed the idea of a new competition  – which came to be the Asian Games. The Asian Athletic Federation would eventually be formed. A preparatory committee was set up to draft the charter for this new body. On 13 February 1949, the Asian Athletic Federation was formally inaugurated in and New Delhi, announced as the inaugural host city to be held in 1950.

Crisis, reorganisation, expansion

In 1962, the Games were hit by several crises. The host country Indonesia, refused to permit the participation of Israel and Taiwan due to political recognition issues. The IOC terminated its sponsorship of the Games and terminated Indonesia's membership in the IOC. The Asian Football Confederation (AFC), International Amateur Athletics Federation (IAAF) and International Weightlifting Federation (IWF), also removed their recognition of the Games.

South Korea renounced its plan to host the 1970 Asian Games on the grounds of a national security crisis; the main reason was due to a financial crisis. The previous host, Thailand, would host the Games in Bangkok using funds transferred from South Korea. Japan was asked to host but declined the opportunity as they were already committed to Expo '70 in Osaka. This edition marked the Games' inaugural television broadcasting, world-wide. In Tehran, in 1974, the Games formally recognized the participation of China, North Korea and Mongolia. Israel was allowed to participate despite the opposition from the Arab world, while Taiwan was permitted to continue taking part (as "Chinese Taipei") although its status was abolished in general meeting on 16 November 1973 by Games Federation.

Prior to the 1978 Games, Pakistan retracted its plan to host the 1975 Games due to a financial crisis and political issues. Thailand offer to host and the Games were held in Bangkok. As in 1962, Taiwan and Israel were refused the participation by Games Federation, amid political issues and security fears. Several governing bodies protested the ban. The IAAF threatened to bar the participating athletes from the 1980 Summer Olympics. Several nations withdraw prior to the Games opening.

These events led the National Olympic Committees in Asia to revise the constitution of the Asian Games Federation. The Olympic Council of Asia was created in November 1981, excluding Israel. India was scheduled to host in 1982 and the OCA decided not to drop the old AGF timetable. The OCA formally started to supervise the Games with the South Korea 1986 Asian Games. In the succeeding Games, Taiwan (Republic of China) was re-admitted, under pressure by the People's Republic of China to compete as Chinese Taipei.

In 1994, the Games included the inaugural participation of the former republics of the Soviet Union: Kazakhstan, Kyrgyzstan, Tajikistan, Turkmenistan, and Uzbekistan. It was also the inaugural Games held in a host country outside its capital city. However, Iraq was suspended from the Games due to the 1990 Persian Gulf War. North Korea boycotted the Games due to political issues. The Games were hampered during the opening ceremony by the death of Nareshkumar Adhikari, the chief of the Nepalese delegation.

The 1998 Games marked the fourth time the Games were held in Bangkok, Thailand. The opening ceremony was on 6 December; the previous three were on 9 December. King Bhumibol Adulyadej opened the Games; the closing ceremony was on 20 December (the same date as all the previous games hosted by Thailand).

Symbols
The Asian Games Movement uses symbols to represent the ideals embodied in the Asian Games charter. The Asian Games motto is "Ever Onward" which was designed and proposed by Guru Dutt Sondhi upon the creation of the Asian Games Federation in 1949. The Asian Games symbol is a bright sun in red with 16 rays and a white circle in the middle of its disc which represents the ever glimmering and warm spirit of the Asian people.

Mascots

Since the 1982 Asian Games in New Delhi, India, the Asian Games have had a mascot, usually an animal native to the area or occasionally human figures representing the cultural heritage.

Participation

All 45 members affiliated to the Olympic Council of Asia (OCA) are eligible to participate in the Games.

According to membership in the OCA, transcontinental Kazakhstan participates in the Asian Games but Egypt does not as a country with Asian minor region in Sinai, participating in the African Games instead. Various countries participating in the European Games rather than the Asian Games whose major geographical parts located in Asian continent: Turkey and Russia/Soviet Union; almost completely in Asia: Azerbaijan and Georgia; wholly in Asia: Cyprus, Armenia, and Israel.

In history, 46 National Olympic Committees (NOCs) have sent competitors to the Games. Israel has been excluded from the Games since 1976, the reason cited as being due to security reasons. Israel requested to participate in the 1982 Games, but the request was rejected by the organizers due to the Munich massacre. Israel is now a member of the European Olympic Committees (EOC) and competes at the European Games.

Taiwan, Palestine, Hong Kong, and Macau participate in the Asian Games according to membership in OCA. Due to its continuing ambiguous political status, Taiwan participates in the Games under the flag of Chinese Taipei since 1990. Macau NOC is allowed to compete as one of the NOCs in Asian Games, despite not being recognized by the International Olympic Committee (IOC) for participation in the Olympic Games.

In 2007, the President of OCA, Sheikh Ahmed Al-Fahad Al-Ahmed Al-Sabah, rejected the proposal to allow Australia to participate in the Games. He stated that while Australia would add good value to the Asian Games, it would be unfair to the Oceania National Olympic Committees (ONOC). Being members of ONOC, Australia and New Zealand participate in Pacific Games since 2015. This motion was mooted again in 2017 after Australia's participation in the 2017 Asian Winter Games as they are in discussions to become a full Asian Games member from 2022 or 2026. However, the Australian Olympic Committee announced that Australia would be allowed a small contingent of athletes for the 2022 Games, as long as the qualification for Summer Olympics events such as basketball and volleyball are through Asia.

There are only seven countries, namely India, Indonesia, Japan, the Philippines, Sri Lanka, Singapore and Thailand that have competed in all editions of the games.

List of Asian Games

Sports

The average for the edition of events by the edition of the Asian Games is of nearly 260 events with 24 sports by edition.
Fifty-one sports, spanning 39 different disciplines and nearly 400 events, have been part of the Asian Games program at one point or another, including the 2018 Games in Indonesia. The edition where the largest number of events was the Guangzhou 2010 Games, where 476 events in 42 sports were contested. The number of events varies according to edition and the demands of the local organizing committee, along with those of the host country. It was established in 2011, that the Games program would respect the eventual changes to the Olympic Games program along with this, eight extremely popular sports in Asia are in the program, plus up to 7 chosen by the local organization.

Disciplines

Medal count

Of the 46 National Olympic Committees participating throughout the history of the Games, 43 nations have won at least a single medal in the competition, leaving three nations: Bhutan, Maldives and Timor-Leste yet to win a single medal. 38 nations have won at least one gold medal (only Japan and India have done so at every Asian Games), while Japan and China became the only two nations in history to emerge as overall champions.

Most valuable player award
The most valuable player (MVP) award was introduced since 1998 Games in Bangkok, Thailand. Below is the list of winners:

Centennial Festival
On 8 November 2012, the OCA decided at its 31st General Assembly in Macau to create a special multi-sport event called Asian Games Centennial Festival in celebration of the 100th anniversary of the Oriental Games (later became Far Eastern Championship Games). OCA awarded the Philippines the hosting rights as it was also the host 100 years previous. The event was originally scheduled to be held in Boracay, Malay, Aklan on 27 to 29 November 2013 but due to the events surrounding Typhoon Haiyan, it was moved to January 2014.

See also

Asian Beach Games
Asian Winter Games
Asian Indoor and Martial Arts Games
Asian Youth Games

References

External links

 Olympic Council of Asia: Games

 

 
1951 establishments in Asia
Recurring sporting events established in 1951
Asian international sports competitions
Quadrennial sporting events
Olympic Council of Asia